Jeremy Ives (born 25 December 1996) is a Zimbabwean cricketer. He made his Twenty20 debut for Zimbabwe against Free State in the 2016 Africa T20 Cup on 9 September 2016. Prior to his Twenty20 debut, he was part of Zimbabwe's squad for the 2016 Under-19 Cricket World Cup.

References

External links
 

1996 births
Living people
Zimbabwean cricketers
Place of birth missing (living people)